Mina Zaman Chowdhury is a Jatiya Party (Ershad) politician and the former Member of Bangladesh Parliament from a reserved women's seat.

Early life 
Chowdhury was born to Khan Bahadur Abdur Rahim Choudhury and Zobeda Rahim Choudhury. She was married to the former chairman of Rajshahi Division Education Board, Shamsuzzaman Chowdhury.

Career
Zaman was elected to parliament from a reserved women's seat as a Jatiya Party candidate in 1986. She founded Jalalabad Hostoshilpo Shongstha, Monjuri Prokashoni, and Ladies' Association, Rajshahi.

Death 
Zaman died on 22 February 2016.

References

Jatiya Party politicians
3rd Jatiya Sangsad members
Year of birth missing
Women members of the Jatiya Sangsad
20th-century Bangladeshi women politicians
2016 deaths